Line S3 of the Chengdu Metro, also known as Ziyang Line, is an under construction rapid transit line in Sichuan Province, China. The line is 38.7 km long and connects Futian station in Chengdu to Ziyang North railway station in Ziyang. It is expected to open in late 2024.

Description 
The line will use 160 km/h Type-A trains. The investment is 14.93 billion CNY. The line will have both underground and ground level sections. It also passes through Tuo River between 1st Tuo River Bridge and 3rd Tuo River Bridge.

Total investment for the line is 14.93 billion CNY. 40% is paid by Chengdu; relocation fee in Ziyang is paid by Ziyang Government; 54.1% left is mortgage from bank.

Stations

Trains and Operation 

The line uses Type-A Trains operating at 160 km/h speed and powered by 25kV AC overhead lines.

The whole line will use 4-car Trains in opening and foreseeable future, with 11 Trains (44 Cars) planning to be purchased.

References 

Chengdu Metro lines
Transport infrastructure under construction in China